is a party video game series originally created by Dragon Quest designer Yuji Horii. It is currently owned by Square Enix and Kadokawa. The first game was released in Japan on Nintendo's Famicom console in 1991. Since then, new installments in the series have been released for the Super Famicom, PlayStation, PlayStation 2, PlayStation Portable, Nintendo DS, Mobile Phones, Android, iOS, PlayStation 4 and PlayStation Vita. The series was exclusive to Japan prior to the 2011 Itadaki Street Wii, which is released as Fortune Street in North America and Boom Street in PAL regions.

Development
Horii in a 1989 interview stated he was working on a board game with former Famitsu editor Yoshimitsu Shiozaki and that working in a "completely different genre" to the Dragon Quest games was worthwhile. While creating the first stage, a play test revealed the board was really hard, so a practice stage was constructed and was also too difficult, leading to stage one eventually becoming stage four. The game was later incorporated into remakes of Dragon Quest III as a new minigame. In 2011, game creator Yuji Horii stated he had considered bringing Itadaki Street to international audiences.

Common elements
The games are similar to Monopoly: players roll one die to advance around a board, purchase unowned property they land on and earn money when opponents land on the player's property, and draw cards when they land on certain spaces. The games differ from Monopoly in that players can buy and sell stocks of a block, affecting the value of the block's stock by buying or selling that block's stock or by developing a player-owned property of that block which increases the value per share of stock for that block. It is not necessary to own the entire block to develop a property, though controlling more than one property of a block allows the player to develop their properties to larger buildings and collect more from opponents. Players must collect a set of four suits to level up and collect additional gold when they pass the starting position/bank. In most versions, up to four players can compete to win each board. To win, a player must make it back to the bank with the board's required amount, which includes the total value of the player's stocks, property value, and gold on hand. Minigames and a stock market for more experienced players are also featured.

Games

Reception
IGN gave Fortune Street, the series' first English localization in North America, a "Good" rating for its deep board game gameplay but saying it could have been more interactive. Siliconera noted that the introduction of established franchise characters from Final Fantasy, Dragon Quest, and the Mario games' has greatly increased the games popularity and mindshare. Fortune Street, the series' first international release, was greeted with mixed reviews, praising the character selection and deep gameplay, but slighting its lengthy time commitment.

A screenshot from Fortune Street showing Yoshi wishing to be Tax exempt briefly circulated online as part of a larger series of Internet memes involving Yoshi committing tax fraud.

See also
 List of Square Enix video game franchises

References

External links 

ASCII Corporation games
Crossover video games
Digital board games
Party video games
Square Enix franchises
Tomcat System games
Video game franchises introduced in 1991